The 3rd Guards Brigade "Kune" (lit. Martens) (Croatian: 3. gardijska brigada "Kune"), was a Croatian Army guards brigade formed on 29 April 1991 in Vinkovci, Eastern Croatia. During the Croatian War of Independence, the 3rd Guards Brigade primarily operated in the regions of Slavonia and Baranja in Eastern Croatia.

History 
Formed as the 3rd "A" Brigade of the Croatian National Guard (Croatian: Zbor narodne garde or ZNG) in 1991, the 3rd Guards Brigade initially consisted of four battalions stationed in Osijek, Vinkovci, Slavonski Brod and Vukovar. Approximately 10,000 members served with the brigade with 369 killed, 1088 injured and 17 missing in action.

Between 1991 and 1995, the 3rd Guards Brigade was involved in numerous engagements including:

 Battle of Vukovar (4th Battalion)
 Battle of Osijek
 Operation Maslenica
 Operation Flash

During Operation Storm, the 3rd Guards Brigade was deployed in defense of the city of Osijek and did not see any combat action.

Post war 
In 2003, the 3rd Guards Brigade "Kune" was disbanded and was merged with the 5th Guards Brigade "Sokolovi" to form the 3rd Armoured Guards Brigade (3.GOMBR). With the reorganisation of the Croatian Armed Forces in 2007, 3. GOMBR was reformed as the current day Armored Mechanized Guard Brigade (Croatian: Gardijska oklopno-mehanizirana brigada (GOMBR)) and with the creation of the Tank Battalion "Kune", the name of the 3rd Guards Brigade is perpetuated.

References

Military units and formations established in 1991
Military units and formations disestablished in 2003
Brigades of Croatia
Military units and formations of the Croatian War of Independence
1991 establishments in Croatia